The Flinn-Engdahl regions (or F-E regions) comprise a set of contiguous seismic zones which cover the Earth's surface. In seismology, they are the standard for localizing earthquakes. The scheme was proposed in 1965 by Edward A. Flinn and E. R. Engdahl. The first official definition was published in 1974 and later revised in 1995. Since that time, region outlines and numbers have remained unchanged, but region names have changed to reflect official place name changes, e.g. the Queen Charlotte Islands have been known as Haida Gwaii since 2010. 

Because each F-E region is composed of 1x1 degree blocks with integer latitudes and longitudes, the borders of the F-E regions may differ from political boundaries. For instance, the F-E region 545 ("Northern Italy") also includes parts of France, Switzerland, Austria and Slovenia. After the 1995 revision there are 754 F-E regions, sequentially numbered from 1 to 757 with three gaps (172, 299 and 550) at dissolved regions. The seismic regions are grouped into 50 larger geographic regions.

List of seismic regions

References

External links 
Summary of F-E regions (USGS)
Flinn-Engdahl regions Service viewer (EMSC). 

Earthquakes